Lorenzo (Lawrence) Scupoli (ca. 1530 – 28 November 1610) was the author of Il combattimento spirituale (The Spiritual Combat), one of the most important works of Catholic spirituality.

Life
Scupoli was from Otranto in Apulia. At baptism, he received the name Francesco (Francis). Being already at a mature age in 1569, he joined the Theatines. He took Holy Orders exceptionally fast, after eight years.

In 1585 he was accused of breaking the rule. He was arrested for a year and deprived of the priestly faculties. Finally he was exculpated from blame, but he had to wait for it almost till his death. He endured the injust accusations and punishments with humility, sacrificing the suffering for various intentions.

The Spiritual Combat

In 1589 in Venice the first edition of the work of his life was printed. At once it gained huge esteem and became a bestseller. During the first 20 years it was published 60 times and translated into German, Latin, French, English and Spanish. Next there were made Portuguese, Croatian, Polish, Armenian, Greek (by Nicodemus the Hagiorite), Arabian and Japanese versions. In the 19th century, Russian monk Theophanes extensively revised it, writing Unseen Warfare, a book which was influential in the Eastern Orthodox Church. To date there have been as many as 600 editions of The Spiritual Combat.

The Combat is a practical manual of living. At first it teaches that the sense of life is incessant fighting against egoistic longings and replacing them with sacrifice and charity. The one who does not do this loses, and suffers in Hell; the one who does it, trusting not in his own, but God's power, triumphs and is happy in Heaven. The work of Scupoli analyses various usual situations and advises how to cope with them, preserving a pure conscience and improving virtue. It emphasizes also the boundless goodness of God, which is the cause of all good. What is bad originates from the human who rebels against God.

External links
 
The Spiritual Combat in the original language 
The Spiritual Combat in English
The Spiritual Combat in French

1530s births
1610 deaths
People from Otranto
Catholic philosophers
Catholic theology and doctrine
16th-century Italian Roman Catholic priests
Italian philosophers
Theatines